The Texas Health and Human Services Commission (HHSC) is an agency within the Texas Health and Human Services System. 
In September 2016, Texas began transforming how it delivers health and human services to qualified Texans, with a goal of making the Health and Human Services System more efficient and effective.  Sept. 1, 2017, marked another major milestone in this transformation.

The new accountable, restructured system:
 Makes it easier for people to find out about the services or benefits for which they may qualify.
 Better integrates programs by removing bureaucratic silos and grouping similar programs and services together.
 Creates clear lines of accountability within the organization.
 Includes well-defined and objective performance metrics for all organizational areas.

Texas Health and Human Services now consists of 2 agencies: the Texas Health and Human Services Commission and the Texas Department of State Health Services (DSHS). HHS is headquartered in Austin, TX.

Benefits and services provided
Medicaid for families and children
Long-term care for people who are older or have disabilities
SNAP (Supplemental Nutrition Assistance Program) food benefits and TANF (Temporary Assistance For Needy Families) cash assistance for families
Behavior health services
Services to help keep people who are older or who have disabilities in their homes or communities
Services for women and people with special health needs

Oversight of regulatory functions
Licensing and credentialing of long-term care facilities, such as nursing homes and assisted living
Licensing child care providers
Managing the day-to-day operations of state supported living centers and state hospitals

More information
Texas Department of State Health Services (DSHS)

Many of the direct client services that were performed by DSHS, such as services for women and children, and people with special health care needs, were transferred to HHSC in September 2016. DSHS now focuses on providing these functions:

 Vital statistics, such as birth and death records
 Compiling and disseminating health data on more than 25 topics
 Chronic and infectious disease prevention and laboratory testing
 Licensing and regulating facilities on topics from asbestos to mobile food establishments to youth camps

Texas Department of Aging and Disability Services (DADS)

The 84th Texas Legislature, 2015, abolished this agency effective Sept. 1, 2017. DADS services were transferred to HHSC.

Texas Department of Family and Protective Services (DFPS)

House Bill 5, 85th Regular Legislative Session, 2017, established DFPS as an agency independent of Texas Health and Human Services effective Sept. 1, 2017. To comply with previous legislation, on Sept. 1, 2017, HHSC assumed responsibility for the child care licensing function previously managed by DFPS.

External links
 Texas Health and Human Services
 Texas Health Data
 Texas Health and Human Services Commission recipient profile on USAspending.gov

Health and Human Services Commission